This is a list of vigilantes featured in popular culture and entertainment media. For commentary, see the main vigilante article.

Film

1920 - 1980
 The Mark of Zorro (1920)
 Robin Hood (1922)
 Don Q, Son of Zorro (1925)
 In Old Arizona (1928)
 The Beast of the City (1932) 
 The Scarlet Pimpernel (1934) 
 Black Legion (1937)
 The Adventures of Robin Hood (1938)
 The Oklahoma Kid (1939)
 The Mark of Zorro (1940)
 The Son of Monte Cristo (1940)
 The Oxbow Incident (1943)
 Cornered (1945)
 The Bandit of Sherwood Forest (1946)
 House of Strangers (1949)
 Obsession (1949)
 The Elusive Pimpernel (1950)
 Rogues of Sherwood Forest (1950)
 The Story of Robin Hood and His Merrie Men (1952)
 The Big Heat (1953)
 Broken Lance (1954)
 Kiss Me Deadly (1955)
 The Big Show (1961)
 Cape Fear (1962)
 The Sons of Katie Elder (1965)
 Dirty Harry series (1971, 1973, 1976, 1983, 1988) 
 Shaft (1971) and (2000)
 Billy Jack (1971) 
 Coffy (1973)
 High Plains Drifter (1973)
 Robin Hood (1973)
 The Seven-Ups (1973)
 Walking Tall franchise (1973, 1975, 1977; 2004)
 Death Wish series (1974, 1982, 1985, 1987, 1994, 2017)
 Street Law (1974)
 T.N.T. Jackson (1974)
 Truck Turner (1974)
 The Mark of Zorro (1974)
 Deadly Hero (1976)
 Taxi Driver (1976)
 Trackdown (1976)
 Vigilante Force (1976)
 Lipstick (1976)
 I Spit on Your Grave (1978)
 Superman (1978)
 Mad Max (1979)

1980 - 2004
 The Exterminator (1980) and its sequel Exterminator 2 (1984)
 Zorro, The Gay Blade (1981)
 Fighting Back (1982)
 The Star Chamber (1983)
 Vigilante (1983)
 Savage Streets (1984)
 Pale Rider (1985)
 Lethal Weapon series (1987, 1989, 1992, 1998)
 Mr. India (1987)
 Above the Law (1988)
 Shahenshah (1988)
 Batman franchise (1989, 1992, 1995, 1997; 2005, 2008, 2012, 2016)
 Spider-Man franchise (2002, 2004, 2007; 2012, 2014)
 The Punisher franchise (1989, 2004, 2008)
 Teenage Mutant Ninja Turtles franchise (1990, 1991, 1993, 2007, 2014, 2016)
 Darkman (1990)
 Hard to Kill (1990) 
 Robin Hood (1991)
 One Good Cop (1991)
 Robin Hood: Prince of Thieves (1991)
 Cape Fear (1991)
 Unforgiven (1992)
 Batman: Mask of the Phantasm (1993)
 Falling Down (1993)
 The Crow (1994)
 The Shadow (1994)
 Jimmy Hollywood (1994)
 Leon aka The Professional (1994)
 Darkman II: The Return of Durant (1995)
 Desperado (1995) 
 Darkman III: Die Darkman Die (1996)
 Eye for an Eye (1996)
 The Crow: City of Angels (1996)
 A Time to Kill (1996)
 Blade franchise (1998, 2002, 2004)
 The Mask of Zorro (1998) and its sequel The Legend of Zorro (2005)
 The Boondock Saints (1999) and its sequel The Boondock Saints II: All Saints Day (2009)
 The Limey (1999)
 Chopper (2000)
 The Crow: Salvation (2000)
 Unbreakable (2000)
 Skins (2002)
 Daredevil (2003)
 A Man Apart (2003)
 4 the People (2004)
 Catwoman (2004)
 Dead Man's Shoes (2004)
 The Incredibles (2004)
 Man on Fire (2004)
 Saw series (2004, 2005, 2006, 2007, 2008, 2009, 2010, 2017)
 Suspect Zero (2004)
 Van Helsing (2004)

2005 - present
 Anniyan (2005)
 The Crow: Wicked Prayer (2005)
 The Devil's Rejects (2005)
 Four Brothers (2005)
 Hard Candy (2005)
 Sin City (2005)
 V for Vendetta (2006)
 The Brave One (2007)
 Death Sentence (2007)
 Hot Fuzz (2007)
 Ghost Rider (2007)
 Outlaw (2007)
 Shooter (2007)
 Shoot 'Em Up (2007)
 Straightheads (2007)
 Gardener of Eden (2007)
 Taken (2008)
 Hancock (2008)
 Beer for My Horses (2008)
 Gran Torino (2008) 
 The Spirit (2008)
 Watchmen (2009)
 Superman/Batman: Public Enemies  (2009)
 Harry Brown (2009)
 Law Abiding Citizen (2009)
 Batman: Under the Red Hood (2010)
 Defendor (2010)
 Edge of Darkness (2010)
 Faster (2010)
 Kick-Ass (2010) and its sequel Kick-Ass 2 (2013)
 Machete (2010) and its sequel Machete Kills (2013)
 Robin Hood (2010)
 Super (2010)
 Hobo with a Shotgun (2011)
 Gone (2012)
 Bad Ass (2012)
 The Amazing Spider-Man (2012)
 Dredd (2012)
 Jack Reacher (2012)
 The Lone Ranger (2013)
 Prisoners (2013)
 Odd Thomas (2013)
 Man of Steel (2013)
 The Equalizer (2014)
 John Wick (2014)
 Kite (2014) 
 Mr X (2015)
 Suicide Squad (2016)
 The Lego Batman Movie (2017)
 The Dark Tower (2017)
 Robin Hood (2018)
 Bhavesh Joshi Superhero (2018)
 Birds of Prey (2020)

Television

Literature
 Crossfire (1998) by Miyuki Miyabe
 The Virginian by Owen Wister (1902), the first American western novel based on the theme of "frontier justice"
 Jimmie Dale, alias the Gray Seal (1914) by Frank L. Packard the first masked urban crime-fighter in American popular culture.
 Zorro (1919) by Johnston McCulley
 Without Remorse (1993) by Tom Clancy, explicitly about an ex-US Navy SEAL wiping out a gang of drug dealers
 Darkly Dreaming Dexter (2004), Dearly Devoted Dexter (2005), and Dexter in the Dark (2007) by Jeff Lindsay, with adapted TV series Dexter (2006), all about fictional character Dexter Morgan who by day is a blood splatter expert for the Miami-Dade Police Department and by night hunts down and kills those who he feels "deserve to die"
 The Chocolate War (1973) by Robert Cormier, The Vigils, a semi-private group (students and teachers know of them but do not speak of them) who run the school, giving students "assignments" that bend or break school rules and regulations
 The Executioner (1963–) by Don Pendleton, a book series about an ex-US Army Master Sergeant sniper named Mack Bolan and his "war" against the Mafia
 Khabardar Shahri (rough Hindi translation of "vigilante"), one of the most famous vimal series of novels by Surender Mohan Pathak in which the hero, a serious offender on brink of reform takes up arms once again to punish five rapists one of whom is nephew of the kingpin of the local crime syndicate which results in a new gang war and the unfortunate Vimal find himself back in world of violence
 Dirty Weekend (1991) by Helen Zahavi is about a young woman who kills seven predatory males over three nights. It was later made into a movie (1993) by film director Michael Winner.

Comics
dead pool

Video games

References

Lists of fictional characters by occupation